Sudipta Chakraborty is an Indian actor who mostly works in Bengali cinema. She won the National Film Award for Best Supporting Actress for the film Bariwali.

She completed her school leaving examination from Kendriya Vidyalaya, Fort William. She graduated with an Honours degree in English.

Her elder sisters Bidipta Chakraborty and Bidisha are also popular actors. Sudipta made her debut in the film Sanghaat.

Work 

Films

 Sanghaat (Debut Film) (1997)
 Bariwali (2000)
 Mondo Meyer Upakhyan (2002)
 Robibaar Bikelbela (2004)
 Kalpurush (2005)
 Sangshoy (2006)
 Hitlist (2009)
 Urochithi (2011)
 Nobel Chor (2012)
 Abosheshey (2012)
 Half Serious (2013)
 C/O Sir (2013)
 Goynar Baksho (2013)
 Open Tee Bioscope (2014)
 Buno Haansh (2014)
 Bheetu (2014)
 Chaar (2014)
 Rajkahini (2015)
 Shororipu (2016)
 Dhananjay (2017)
 61 Garpar Lane (2017)
 Mayurakshi (2017)
 Uronchandi (2018)
 Pupa (2018)
 Shobdokolpodroom (2018)
 Samsara (2019)
 Jyeshthoputro (2019)
 Basu Paribar (2019)
 Satyamev Jayate (Hindi) (2019)
 Chegue (2022)
 Shubho Noboborsho (Yet to release)
 Bhoot Pori (Yet to release)
 Tritiyo (2022)
 A Separate Sky (2021)
 Haariye Jaoar Aage (Yet to release)
 Porshi (Yet to release)
 Haar Maana Haar (2022)
 Searching For Happiness (Yet to release)
 Manohar Pandey (Hindi) (Yet to release)
 The Scavenger of Dreams (Hindi) (Yet to release)
 Maaya (yet to release)
 Bagha Jatin
Plays
(in alphabetical order)
 Baghu Manna
 Bikele Bhorer Shorshe Phool
 Kacher Dewal

Shruti Alekhya

 See You

Television
Bigg Boss Bangla (2013)
Khela
Binni Dhaner Khoi (later replaced by Sohini Sanyal)
Nana Ronger Dinguli

Web series
Amra 2GayTher (2021)

Awards 

 National Film Award for Best Supporting Actress in Best supporting actress category for the film Bariwali (2000)
 BFJA award for Best Supporting Actress in Best supporting actress category for the film Bariwali
Bengali Film Journalists’ Association Award, 2001 –  Best Supporting Actress for the film 'Bariwali'
 ETV Film Award, 2001 - Best Supporting Actress for the film 'Bariwali'
 Kalakar Award, 2000 – Best News Caster for the Bengali private news bulletin 'Khas Khobor'
 Kalakar Award, 2001 – Best Rising Actress for the film 'Bariwali'
 Anandalok Award, 2001 – Best Anchor for the women's magazine show 'Srimoti' (E TV Bangla)
 Anandalok Award, 2005 – Best Make Over for the daily fiction serial 'Manasi' (Akash Bangla)
 Pratidin Tele Samman, 2005 – Best Anchor for the women's game show 'Dhanni Meye' (Zee Bangla)
 Pratidin Tele Samman, 2006 – Best Performance in a Negative Role for the daily fiction serial Manasi (Akash Bangla)
 Zee Gaurav Award, 2007 – Best Actress for the daily fiction serial 'Khela' (Zee Bangla)
 Zee Gaurav Award, 2012 – Best Actress for the stage play ‘Bikele Bhorer Shorshe Phool’

References

External links 
 
 

Actresses in Bengali cinema
Indian film actresses
Indian television actresses
Indian stage actresses
21st-century Indian actresses
Living people
Actresses from Kolkata
Bengal Film Journalists' Association Award winners
Best Supporting Actress National Film Award winners
Kendriya Vidyalaya alumni
Indira Gandhi National Open University alumni
Year of birth missing (living people)
Bigg Boss Bangla contestants